Solomonica (Moon) de Winter (born 3 June 1997) is a Dutch writer. She is the daughter of the writer couple Leon de Winter and Jessica Durlacher. She is Dutch, but writes in English. She wrote her first book Over the Rainbow when she was 16. This book was published in German as Die Geschichte von Blue, in Dutch as Achter de regenboog and in French as Je m'appelle Blue.

Bibliography 

 Over the Rainbow (2014)
 Natural Law (2022)

References 

1997 births
Living people
21st-century Dutch novelists
People from Bloemendaal
21st-century Dutch women writers
Dutch women novelists